Aurora Luque Ortiz (born 20 September 1962) is a Spanish poet, translator, teacher, and writer based in Andalusia.

Biography
Aurora Luque was born in Almería in 1962. She has a degree in Classical Philology from the University of Granada and has been a professor of Ancient Greek since 1988 in Málaga, where she has developed a large part of her career. She contributed as a columnist to the newspaper Diario Sur from 1999 to 2008.

In October 2008, she was appointed director of the Generation of '27 Cultural Center of the Provincial Deputation of Málaga, a position she held until June 2011.

In 2012 Luque enjoyed a residency at Villa Marguerite Yourcenar in Flanders, Belgium, within its program aimed at European writers. She has participated in various international poetry events and meetings in the Americas (Buenos Aires, Medellín, Bogotá, Santo Domingo, Monterrey, Morelia and Mexico City, Havana, Puerto Rico, Buffalo, and New York), Europe (Thessaloniki, Athens, Milan, Palermo, Naples, Bari, Vienna, Bremen, Rotterdam, Malmö, Stockholm, and Kristianstadt), Africa (Cairo, Alexandria, Tetouan, Tangier, Casablanca, Tunisia, and Cape Verde), and Asia (Israel and the Philippines).

She has lectured at various American universities, including the University of Massachusetts, Saint Louis University, Le Moyne College, Skidmore College, Dickinson College, College of the Holy Cross, CUNY, and Montclair College.

In 2005 she founded the Narila publishing house. She has been part of the Advisory Council of the collection "Puerta del Mar", also of CEDMA, as well as the Governing Council of the Book Institute of the City of Málaga. She has been on the Social Council and is part of the Translation, Literature, and Society research group at the University of Málaga.

Literary career

Poetry
In 1989 Luque's book Problemas de doblaje took second place for the Premio Adonáis de Poesía. In May 2005 she opened the Málaga Book Fair. In 2015 she published Personal & político (Fundación José Manuel Lara), a book with 45 poems that delved into the reality of the Spanish social crisis.

It has been said that she belongs to the same generation as the poet Juan Antonio González Iglesias, one that combines classical tradition with the most furious modernity. With regard to Transitoria, the jury of the Andalusian Critics' Award lauded "the perfect symbiosis between classical language, which knows how to incarnate itself in serene verses, and a colloquial, current speech."

Professor Josefa Álvarez dedicated the study Tradición clásica en la poesía de Aurora Luque (Sevilla, Editorial Renacimiento, 2013) to her.

Translation and criticism
Luque has made translations of French, Latin, and Ancient and Modern Greek poetry, from authors such as Maria Laina, Louise Labé, Renée Vivien, Sappho, Catullus, Meleager, and all of the Greek poets who dealt with themes of eros or the sea. In 2000 she published Los dados de Eros. Antología de poesía erótica griega (Ediciones Hiperión), and in November 2004 the Sappho translation Poemas y testimonios.

As a lecturer, she has worked to rescue forgotten authors, such as the playwright María Rosa Gálvez and the writer and ambassador Isabel Oyarzábal, on whom she focused her interest in 2010.

Works

Poetry

Awards
 1981,  from the University of Granada
 1989, 2nd place for the Premio Adonáis de Poesía
 1992, King Juan Carlos Prize
 1998, finalist for the Rafael Alberti Poetry Prize
 1999, 
 2003, Fray Luis de León Translation Award
 2008, 
 2008, 
 2016, Public Literary Prize from 
 2022, National Poetry Award

References

External links
 

1962 births
20th-century Spanish educators
Spanish women educators
20th-century Spanish poets
20th-century Spanish women writers
21st-century Spanish educators
21st-century Spanish poets
21st-century Spanish women writers
French–Spanish translators
Greek–Spanish translators
Latin–Spanish translators
Living people
People from Almería
Spanish columnists
Spanish translators
Spanish women academics
Spanish women poets
University of Granada alumni
Spanish women columnists
20th-century women educators
21st-century women educators